Mian Farooq Shah (born in Nowshera, Pakistan, June 1907 – May 2012) was an Afghan field hockey player who competed at the 1936 Summer Olympic Games in Berlin, playing in one game. He served as sports minister of Afghanistan (1935–1936). Farooq studied agriculture at the University of Reading in London, England. In August 1931, he became the first man of North West Frontier Province to gain a British pilot's license. He had seven children and multiple grandchildren.

References

External links
 

Afghan male field hockey players
Olympic field hockey players of Afghanistan
Field hockey players at the 1936 Summer Olympics
1907 births
Year of death missing